Barer is a surname. Notable people with the surname include:

Ariela Barer (born 1998), American actress and singer
Burl Barer (born 1947), American writer, literary historian, and radio host
Libe Barer (born 1991), American actress

See also
Bare (disambiguation)
Bares